Ben Berger (1897 – 1988) was a Minneapolis businessman, perhaps best known for being one of the original owners of the Detroit Gems National Basketball League team, which he helped move to Minneapolis and renamed the Minneapolis Lakers.

Biography
Berger was born in Ostrowiec Świętokrzyski, Congress Poland and moved to the United States at age 16 in 1913 at age 16 settling in Fargo, North Dakota. He became a U.S. citizen while serving in World War I. In 1921, he purchased his first movie house in Grand Forks, North Dakota which evolved into a chain of 19 theaters. In 1944, he bought Schiek's Cafe, a popular local nightclub.

In 1947, he along with Morris Chalfen bought the Detroit Gems of the National Basketball League. They relocated and renamed the team the Minneapolis Lakers. He co-owned the team until 1957. During those years the Lakers won 6 league titles (1 NBL and 5 BAA/NBA). They sold the team in 1957.

In the late 1950s, Berger was the owner and president of the minor league hockey team, the Minneapolis Millers.

His wife was Mildred Berger.

Mimi Ajzenstadt is the Mildred and Benjamin Berger Chair in Criminology at the Hebrew University of Jerusalem.

References 

1897 births
1988 deaths
National Basketball League (United States) owners
People from Minneapolis
Los Angeles Lakers owners
American people of Polish-Jewish descent
Congress Poland emigrants to the United States